Krzeszowice  is a town in southern Poland, situated in the Lesser Poland Voivodeship. As of 2004, its population was 9,993. Krzeszowice belongs to Kraków Metropolitan Area, and lies 25 kilometers west of the center of the city of Kraków. The town has a rail station, on a major route from Kraków to Katowice, and lies along National Road Nr. 79, which goes from Warsaw to Bytom. In 1928–1966 the town had the status of a spa. Krzeszowice has a sports club called Świt, founded in 1923.

Krzeszowice is located in southern part of the Kraków-Częstochowa Upland, with numerous caves and valleys in the area. In 1981, when the Complex of Jura Landscape Parks was created, three parks from the gmina of Krzeszowice were added to it (Rudnia Landscape Park, Tenczynek Landscape Park and Kraków Valleys Landscape Park). In 2008, it was selected with 19 villages of Europe - Germany, Poland, Italy and Spain - for the Spanish documentary film "Villages of Europe" Pueblos de Europa, produced by Juan Frutos (Colours Communication Group) and Orange Productions S.L.

History 
First mention of Krzeszowice comes from 1286, when Bishop of Kraków, Paweł z Przemankowa, allowed a man named Fryczek Freton to locate the village of Cressouicy. By 1337, Krzeszowice already had a wooden church of St. Martin. In the mid-15th century, it had a school and a public house. In 1555, Krzeszowice belonged to Stanisław Tęczynski, then it was owned by several noble families - the Sieniawski family, Opaliński family, Czartoryski family, Lubomirski family and, since 1816, the Potocki family.

In the early 17th century, the advantages of local mineral water were discovered by Krzeszowice parish priest, reverend Bernard Bocheński, who mentioned it in the 1625 parish records. In 1778, Prince August Czartoryski opened here first baths, and soon afterwards, patients began visiting Krzeszowice. In 1783–1786, the Vauxhall Palace was built, and in 1819, the Green Bath was opened. Krzeszowice began to prosper, in 1809–1815 and 1855–1867, the town was the seat of a county. In 1815–1846, Krzeszowice belonged to the Free City of Kraków, and to Austria in 1846-1918 within the Grand Duchy of Cracow, Chrzanow Bezirkshauptmannschaft.

A hospital was opened here in 1829, a shelter for the poor in 1843, and in 1844, neo-Gothic church was built. In 1847 Krzeszowice received a rail station, along the newly built route from Kraków to Mysłowice. Local residents took part in the Kraków Uprising, and helped Polish rebels from Russian-controlled Congress Poland, during the January Uprising. In 1850–1855, the Potocki Palace was built, in the Italian Renaissance style, together with English garden. The palace with all its details was not completed until 1870.

By 1910, the population of Krzeszowice was 2619, out of which Jews made 18%. The town continued to develop, with several new enterprises opened here in the late 19th and early 20th century. On December 3, 1924, Krzeszowice was officially incorporated as a town. New districts and blocks of flats were built, and by 1931, the population grew to 3,391. During World War II Krzeszowice belonged to the General Government. The Potocki Palace was restored by polish slave laborer by order of Nazis and renamed by Germans into Haus Kressendorf, becoming summer residence of Hans Frank. Almost all Jewish citizens were murdered in the Holocaust. The German occupation of Krzeszowice ended on 19 January 1945.

Landmarks

Architecture
 St. Martin's Church in the Neo-Gothic style
 Potocki Palace
 Vauxhall Palace

Parks and gardens
 Potocki Gardens

Museums and galleries
The Museum of Krzeszowice Land, a small art gallery with art, objects and furniture.

Religion

 Roman Catholicism (The St. Martin's Church, Grunwaldzka Street 2)
 Jehovah's Witnesses (Congregation Krzeszowice, Kościuszki Street 49)

References

External links
 Krzeszowice official site
 Unofficial Forum in Krzeszowice
 Photos from Krzeszowice
 Jewish Community in Krzeszowice on Virtual Shtetl

Cities and towns in Lesser Poland Voivodeship
Kraków County
Kingdom of Galicia and Lodomeria
Kraków Voivodeship (1919–1939)
Holocaust locations in Poland